Carlos Knox (born October 7, 1974) is a former American basketball player . He is considered one of the best players to ever represent Indiana University – Purdue University Indianapolis, leading NCAA in scoring for two straight seasons. Knox was also named NCAA Player of the Year as a senior with the Jaguars. In 2004, he was inducted into the school's Hall of Fame and his jersey was hung in its basketball facility.

Coaching record

|-
| align="left" |IND
| align="left" |2022
| 27 || 3 || 24 || || align="center" | 6th in East ||- ||- ||- ||-
| align="center" | Missed Playoffs
|-class="sortbottom"
| align="left" |Career
|| ||27 || 3 || 24 |||| || 0 || 0 || 0 || ||

References

External links 
Carlos Knox at RealGM

1974 births
Living people
American men's basketball players
American women's basketball coaches
Basketball coaches from Ohio
Basketball players from Dayton, Ohio
Continental Basketball Association coaches
Guards (basketball)
Indiana Fever coaches
IUPUI Jaguars men's basketball coaches
IUPUI Jaguars men's basketball players
UT Martin Skyhawks men's basketball players